The Musical Unit of the Spanish Royal Guard is the official music service of the Spanish Royal Guard of the Spanish Armed Forces that is dedicated to providing ceremonial honours and music to the King of Spain, the Spanish Royal Family, and public officials. The musical unit is one of many battalion sized units in the regiment, with over 100 professional musicians in its ranks who are chosen from the non-commissioned officers of the Military Music Corps. It is one of the more senior and representative bands in the Spanish Armed Forces, with its repertoire covering a wide range of Army, Navy and Air Force music. The entire unit is currently under the baton of the conductor of the Military Band of the Royal Guard, Colonel Musician Enrique Damián Blasco Cebolla.

History 
The Musical Unit of the Royal Guard was first organized as a singular musical group on February 19, 1874, with its first director being Martín Elexpuru. Its current structure dates back to 1998 and since then it has been constituted by the Symphonic Band, Marching Band and the Fife Section.

Present Day 

Among their obligations are the following:

 Being present at military parades
 Honoring foreign heads of state on their state visits to Madrid 
 Support the everyday ceremonial activities of the Regiment
 Take part in the guard mounting ceremony at the Royal Palace of Madrid every Wednesday from noon to 2pm
 Giving concerts at the Royal Palace on behalf of the regiment
 Performing drill at military tattoos domestically and internationally

The marching band has performed it precision marching drill throughout Europe, with notable performances being in London, Paris, Cologne, Bucharest, and Moscow.

Recordings 
New Anthology of Military Music
Concert of Military Music
Soldiers for Peace
Relay in the Palace
Musical Memory of Spain
Spain in Pasodobles
Suspiros de España

Organization 

 Unit HQ and High Command
 Military Band of the Royal Guard of Spain
 Marching Band
 Symphonic Band
 Mounted Band of Timpani and Bugles, reports to the Royal Escort Squadron
 Corps of Drums (composed of Drums and bugles)
 Fife Section 
 Pipe band
 Brass fanfare section 
 Royal Guard Big band
 Royal Guard Chamber Ensemble

List of directors

References

External links 

 Official website of the Royal Guard (in Spanish)

Spanish ceremonial units
Military bands
Spanish monarchy
Spanish Army